National Council elections were held in Kuwait on 10 June 1990. The Council (only half of which was elected) was created by the Emir to try to appease protestors. A total of 574 candidates contested the 50 seats, and although opposition called for a boycott, turnout was 62.3%. Abdulaziz F. Al-Masaeed was elected as Chairman of the Council.

References

Kuwait
National Council election
Elections in Kuwait
Non-partisan elections